"Vitamin R (Leading Us Along)" is a song by American rock group Chevelle. It was released in August 2004 as the lead single from their third studio album, This Type of Thinking (Could Do Us In). It was their second number-one hit on the Billboard Hot Mainstream Rock Tracks chart and reached number three on the Billboard Hot Modern Rock Tracks chart.

Background
In interviews, it has been stated that "Vitamin R" is Ritalin. The song was written about a friend of the Loeffler brothers, who was misdiagnosed with ADHD, and developed an addiction to Ritalin.

Critical reception
Loudwire ranked it the second greatest Chevelle song.

Music video
The song's music video revolves around imagery seen in the items of a cubicle. The images become real, life size landscapes that vocalist Pete Loeffler is seen drifting through.

Charts

Certifications

See also
List of number-one mainstream rock hits (United States)

References

External links
 Video
 [ Chevelle - Artist Chart History]

2004 singles
Chevelle (band) songs
Songs written by Pete Loeffler
2004 songs
Epic Records singles
Song recordings produced by Michael Baskette
Songs written by Sam Loeffler